The Australia–Japan football rivalry is a sports rivalry that exists between the national association football teams of each country, regarded as one of Asia's biggest football rivalries. The rivalry is a relatively recent one, born from a number of highly competitive matches between the two teams since Australia joined the Asian Football Confederation in 2006. The two teams have played each other in several significant matches, including a World Cup group stage match, the 2011 Asian Cup Final and have been drawn in the same group in four consecutive World Cup qualification campaigns.

Origins

The first match between the two teams was played at the 1956 Olympics, ending in a 2–0 win for the Australians.
Another dozen matches were played between Australia and Japan until a semi-final match at the 2001 Confederations Cup which ended in a 1–0 for Japan, but the match-up really only emerged as a rivalry after 2006, when Australia joined the AFC, especially the FIFA World Cup qualification games.
The first match between the two sides after this was during the 2006 FIFA World Cup, a group stage game where Australia were still technically competing as Oceania representatives. With just six minutes left, Japan led by a single goal, only for Australia to score thrice in succession to secure their first ever win in a World Cup Finals match in what is regarded as one of the greatest moments in Australian sporting history.

A number of fierce qualifying matches over the next few years enhanced the rivalry, and Japan got revenge for their World Cup defeat by knocking the Socceroos out of the 2007 Asian Cup at the quarter-final stage via penalty shootout. In 2011, Japan again beat the Socceroos in an Asian Cup, this time in the 2011 final with a solitary goal in extra time sealing the championship.

Men's matches

Women's matches
Like their men's counterparts, the two nations also have a strong rivalry in the women's counterparts, with both Australia and Japan among Asia's strongest and some of the world's finest; and like the men's, Japan also dominates Australia when it comes to women's. However, unlike the men's team of Australia, the women's team of Australia is, by far, the first and only football team from the country to have won against Japan in Japanese soil, when they did so in 29 February 2016 as part of the qualification for the 2016 Summer Olympics.

Overall

Top scorers

Players in bold are still available for selection.

References

International association football rivalries
Australia national soccer team rivalries
Japan national football team rivalries
Australia–Japan sports relations